Lena Frier Kristiansen (born 12 March 1983) is a badminton player from Denmark. In 2001, she won the silver and bronze medals at the European Junior Championships in the mixed team and doubles respectively. Partneres with Kamilla Rytter Juhl, they won the bronze medal the 2006 European Championships in the women's doubles event, and made it to the gold medal in 2008. They also competed at the 2008 Beijing Olympic Games, but was defeated in the first round by the Japanese pair Kumiko Ogura and Reiko Shiota in the rubber games.

Achievements

European Championships
Women's doubles

European Junior Championships
Mixed doubles

BWF Superseries
The BWF Superseries, launched on 14 December 2006 and implemented in 2007, is a series of elite badminton tournaments, sanctioned by Badminton World Federation (BWF). BWF Superseries has two levels: Superseries and Superseries Premier. A season of Superseries features twelve tournaments around the world, which introduced since 2011, with successful players invited to the Superseries Finals held at the year end.

Women's doubles

 BWF Superseries Finals tournament
 BWF Superseries Premier tournament
 BWF Superseries tournament

BWF Grand Prix
The BWF Grand Prix has two levels, Grand Prix and Grand Prix Gold. It is a series of badminton tournaments sanctioned by the Badminton World Federation (BWF) since 2007. The World Badminton Grand Prix sanctioned by International Badminton Federation (IBF) since 1983.

Women's doubles

Mixed doubles

 BWF Grand Prix Gold tournament
 BWF & IBF Grand Prix tournament

BWF International Challenge/Series
Women's doubles

Mixed doubles

 BWF International Challenge tournament
 BWF International Series tournament

References

External links
 
 

1983 births
Living people
People from Randers
Danish female badminton players
Badminton players at the 2008 Summer Olympics
Olympic badminton players of Denmark
Sportspeople from the Central Denmark Region
21st-century Danish women